How Long Has This Been Going On? is a 1978 studio album by Sarah Vaughan, accompanied by a quartet led by Oscar Peterson.

Track listing
 "I've Got the World on a String" (Harold Arlen, Ted Koehler) – 5:38
 "Midnight Sun" (Sonny Burke, Lionel Hampton, Johnny Mercer) – 4:40
 "How Long Has This Been Going On?" (George Gershwin, Ira Gershwin) – 6:03
 "You're Blasé" (Ord Hamilton, Bruce Sievier) – 5:10
 "Easy Living" (Ralph Rainger, Leo Robin) – 4:40
 "More Than You Know" (Edward Eliscu, Billy Rose, Vincent Youmans) – 6:46
 "My Old Flame" (Sam Coslow, Arthur Johnston) – 6:14
 "Teach Me Tonight" (Sammy Cahn, Gene de Paul) – 3:06
 "Body and Soul" (Edward Heyman, Robert Sour, Frank Eyton, Johnny Green) – 3:43
 "When Your Lover Has Gone" (Einar Aaron Swan) – 2:54

Personnel
 Sarah Vaughan – vocal
 Oscar Peterson – piano
 Joe Pass – guitar
 Ray Brown – double bass
 Louie Bellson – drums

References

1978 albums
Sarah Vaughan albums
Albums produced by Norman Granz
Pablo Records albums